As sudayrah may refer to:

As sudayrah, Makkah
As sudayrah, Al Madinah